Lucknow City railway station is one of the suburban railway stations in Lucknow district, Uttar Pradesh. Its code is LC. It serves Lucknow city. The station consists of three platforms.

Trains 

 Krishak Express
 Barauni–Lucknow Express
 Utsarg Express
 Nakaha Jungle–Lucknow Junction Passenger
 Barabanki–Lucknow Junction MEMU
 Utsarg Express
 Bandra Terminus–Gorakhpur Avadh Express
 Bandra Terminus–Muzaffarpur Avadh Express
 Gorakhpur–Sitapur Express (via Barhni)
 Ruhelkhand Express

References

Railway stations in Lucknow
Lucknow NER railway division